Below the Surface is a 1938 adventure film set in the coal region of Newcastle, Australia. Only part of the movie survives.

Plot
Two miners compete for an important coal contract. One of them attempts to sabotage the other but fails.

Cast
Stan Tolhurst
Phyllis Reilly
Neil Carlton
Jimmy McMahon
Lawrence Taylor
Reg King
Billy Baker
Leonard Clarke
Frank Baker
Billy Crooks

Production
The main investor in the movie was a prominent music house in Sydney. The film was shot on location in Cronulla, Sydney and Newcastle, with studio work done at Pagewood Studios. Kather and Tolhurt built a mine set themselves. Shooting took place from November 1937 to February 1938.

Release
Like Kathner's first movie, Phantom Gold (1937), it was refused to be considered eligible for registration under the New South Wales Film Quota Act on the grounds of poor quality.

The film was never released to cinemas, the only one of Kather's movies to suffer this fate.

In February 1938 Australian Cinema Entertainments announced plans to make four more features that year for £40,000, the first which was to be Diamonds in the Rough. This did not eventuate. Tolhurst did revive the name with his company, ACE Films, in the late 1940s.

References

External links
Below the Surface in the Internet Movie Database
Below the Surface at National Film and Sound Archive
Below the Surface at Oz Movies

1938 films
1930s adventure drama films
Australian black-and-white films
Australian adventure drama films
1938 drama films
1930s English-language films